Sanne de Laat (born 13 February 1995) is a Dutch archer competing in women's compound events. She won the silver medal in the women's team event and the bronze medal in the women's individual event at the 2021 European Archery Championships held in Antalya, Turkey.

In 2017, De Laat and Mike Schloesser competed in the mixed team compound event at the World Games held in Wrocław, Poland. She also competed in the women's compound individual event. In 2019, De Laat and Schloesser won the silver medal in the mixed team compound event at the European Games held in Minsk, Belarus. She also competed in the women's individual compound event.

She also competed at the 2021 World Archery Championships held in Yankton, United States.

In 2022, she won the women's compound event at the Dutch National Indoor Archery Championships. She represented the Netherlands at the 2022 World Games held in Birmingham, United States. She competed in the women's individual compound event.

References

External links
 

Living people
1995 births
Place of birth missing (living people)
Dutch female archers
Competitors at the 2017 World Games
Competitors at the 2022 World Games
European Games medalists in archery
European Games silver medalists for the Netherlands
Archers at the 2019 European Games
21st-century Dutch women